Jang Won-sam (Hangul: 장원삼, Hanja: 張洹三) (born June 9, 1983 in Changwon, Gyeongsangnam-do, South Korea) is a South Korean left-handed starting pitcher who plays for the LG Twins in the KBO League.

Amateur career
As a junior at Yongma High School in Masan, South Korea, Jang was selected by the Hyundai Unicorns with the 89th pick in the 2nd round (97th overall) of the 2002 KBO Draft. However, he entered Kyungsung University upon graduation from high school instead of turning pro directly.

In 2004, as a junior at Kyungsung University Jang made his first appearance for the South Korea national baseball team at the 2nd World University Baseball Championship in Tainan City, Taiwan. There he led his team the bronze medal alongside Oh Seung-Hwan and Jeong Keun-Woo.

In 2005, Jang was selected for the South Korea national team again, and participated in the Baseball World Cup held in the Netherlands. He helped the team win the silver medal, finishing 4th in strikeouts (24). He pitched an eight shutout inning victory over South Africa in the preliminary round, and appeared in seven of South Korea's 11 games.

Notable international careers

Professional career

Hyundai Unicorns & Heroes 
Signed by the Hyundai Unicorns in 2006, Jang started his pro career as a starting pitcher. In the 2006 KBO season, he finished runner-up to Ryu Hyun-Jin for Rookie of the Year with 2nd in strikeouts (142), 5th in ERA (2.85) and 7th in wins (12), and was selected to the All-Star team. After the season, he was selected for the South Korea national team and competed in the 2006 Asian Games held in Doha, Qatar.

During the 2007 season, he went 9−10 with 132 strikeouts in 168.2 innings, finishing 10th in ERA (3.63).

In the 2008 season, Jang finished with a 12–8 record and a 2.85 ERA in 167.2 innings. He was 4th in wins, 5th in ERA and 4th in strikeouts (126). In August 2008, Jang competed for the South Korea national baseball team in the 2008 Summer Olympics, where they won the gold medal in the baseball tournament. In the tournament, he pitched a 10−0 complete game shutout victory over the Netherlands and tossed 4.1 innings of scoreless relief against China.

In March 2009, Jang was called up to the South Korea national baseball team for the 2009 World Baseball Classic prior to the 2009 KBO season, but had a disappointing performance, pitching to a 5.06 ERA. In South Korea's second game in Round 1 against Japan, Jang came on in relief in the 3rd inning but allowed 3 runs and 4 hits in 2.2 innings pitched. He started the Pool 1 title match against Japan in Round 2, but went only 3 innings allowing 2 runs and 5 hits including the solo home run by Seiichi Uchikawa. Jang struggled the 2009 KBO season with a 5.54 ERA and a record of 4-8, by far the worst of his career.

Samsung Lions 
After the 2009 season, Jang was traded to the Samsung Lions with ₩3 billion won ($3 million). He bounced back in the 2010 season to finish sixth in the league in ERA (3.46), seventh in wins (13) and eighth in strikeouts (115).

Notable international careers

Filmography

Television show

References

External links 
 Profile and stats on the KBO official site

1983 births
2009 World Baseball Classic players
2013 World Baseball Classic players
Asian Games medalists in baseball
Baseball players at the 2006 Asian Games
Baseball players at the 2008 Summer Olympics
Hyundai Unicorns players
KBO League pitchers
Kyungsung University alumni
Living people
Medalists at the 2008 Summer Olympics
Kiwoom Heroes players
Olympic baseball players of South Korea
Olympic gold medalists for South Korea
Olympic medalists in baseball
Samsung Lions players
South Korean baseball players
Asian Games bronze medalists for South Korea
Medalists at the 2006 Asian Games
People from Changwon
Sportspeople from South Gyeongsang Province